Vargashinsky District is an administrative and municipal district (raion), one of the twenty-four in Kurgan Oblast, Russia. It is located in the central and northern parts of the oblast. Its administrative center is the urban locality (an urban-type settlement) of Vargashi. Population:  23,255 (2002 Census);  The population of the administrative center accounts for 46.5% of the district's total population.

References

Notes

Sources

Districts of Kurgan Oblast